Li Mei-shu (13 March 1902 – 6 February 1983) was a Taiwanese painter, sculptor, and politician. Born to an upper-class family in Sankakuyū, Japanese Taiwan (modern-day Sanxia District, New Taipei City).

Education 

Li Meishu began to demonstrate a propensity for painting in his early years. In 1918, he was accepted into the Painting Division of the Taiwan Governor-General's National Language School. He taught himself painting after school through a copy of A Collection of Lectures, which he ordered from Japan through post. Upon graduating, he taught at Zuihō Public School (in modern-day Ruifang District). During this time, he participated in the Summer Art Seminar organized by Ishikawa Kinichiro. His works 'Still Life and Backstreets of Sanxia' were selected for the first and second Taiwan Art Exhibitions (Taiten), respectively.

He then obtained his family’s consent to go to Japan to further his painting studies. In 1929, he was accepted by the Division of Western Painting at the Tokyo School of Fine Arts, where he studied with teachers such as Okada Saburousuke and Kobayashi Mango.

Work and public life 

After graduating in 1934, Li returned to Taiwan and co-founded the Tai-Yang Art Society along with artists such as Liao Chi-chun, Tan Ting-pho, and Yen Shui-long. In 1935, his work Girl at Rest was the special selection of the ninth Taiwan Art Exhibition. In 1939, his work Red Dress was selected for the third Ministry of Education Art Exhibition (Shin Bunten).

After World War II, Li served several terms as chairman of Sanxia street, township representative, and county councilor. From 1945, he served as director of the re-construction committee of Qingshui Zushi (Divine Ancestor) Temple in Sanxia. He invited his friends in the art community, such as Chen Jin, Lin Yushan, Guo Xuehu, to complete the stone walls and sculptures of Zushi Temple together, making Zushi Temple a collective work of the artists.

In 1962, he devoted himself to the promotion of art education by teaching in the art departments of schools such as Chinese Culture University, National Taiwan University of Arts, and National Taiwan Normal University.

Painting style 

The subjects of Li's paintings are depicted in a realist style and are primarily figures, landscapes, and still lifes. Even in the 1950s, when abstract art styles were in favor, his paintings still remained true to realism. Li’s paintings demonstrated strong local sentiments and his love for portraying local people and culture. His great love for Sanxia has produced scenic paintings of Sanxia such as Spring Dawn at Sanxia (1977) and Washing Clothes in the River (1981). He also loved to use his family members as models for his paintings and used photographs to provide an outline or base for his work. Li emphasized the characteristics of the people he was painting through details such as the patterns of their clothing and subject’s relationship with the background.

See also
 Li Mei-shu Memorial Gallery

References

External links

 Li Mei-shu Memorial Gallery, Taiwan Site
 Li Mei-shu Memorial Gallery
 人間國寶 梅樹先
 Starting Out from 23.5°N: Chen Cheng-po, Academia Sinica Digital Center (ASDC)

Taiwanese sculptors
Taiwanese people of Hoklo descent
Artists from New Taipei
1902 births
1983 deaths
20th-century sculptors
Tokyo School of Fine Arts alumni
Politicians of the Republic of China on Taiwan from New Taipei
Academic staff of the National Taiwan Normal University
Academic staff of the National Taiwan University of Arts
Academic staff of the Chinese Culture University